The oblong turtle (Chelodina oblonga), also known commonly as the narrow-breasted snake-necked turtle and the southwestern snake-necked turtle, is a species of turtle in the family Chelidae. The species is endemic to the southwestern part of Western Australia.

The species has been successfully bred in captivity in Cologne Zoological Garden.

While all turtles are popularly believed to be mute, the oblong turtle is known to have a wide range of vocalizations.

Etymology
The specific name, colliei, is in honor of Scottish physician and naturalist Alexander Collie.

Taxonomic history
This species has a very complicated taxonomic history, involving many uses of the available names and a number of mistakes in that usage. In his original concept of the two species involved Gray 1841 and 1856 clearly diagnosed two species, one from northern and one from southwestern Australia. However these were considered a single wide-ranging species by Boulenger 1889. This mistaken concept was followed for some time but was reviewed by Burbidge (1967). Unfortunately they had mixed the names up as was brought out first by Thomson (2000) and has been summarised also by Kuchling (2010).

A submission to the ICZN was put in by Thomson (2006) to maintain the prevailing usage of Chelodina rugosa over the name Chelodina oblonga for the northern snake-necked turtle with further comments by several authors. In 2013 the ICZN handed down its opinion on the issue where they deemed that the Principle of Priority should be followed. According to that ruling, the correct name for the northern snake-necked turtle was Chelodina oblonga and for the south-western snake-necked turtle is Chelodina colliei. Although that ruling required considerable effort over the ensuing 12 months to establish this nomenclature, subsequent research has reversed this finding with respect to Chelodina oblonga.

Kehlmaier et al. (2019) analyzed mitochondrial genomes of key type specimens and resolved several questions regarding taxonomy and nomenclature. They declared Chelodina oblonga a nomen dubium, affirmed Chelodina colliei as the southwestern snake-necked turtle, and called for the name Chelodina rugosa Ogilby, 1890 to be restored to the northern snake-necked turtle. This finding was supported by the findings of Shea et al. (2020) that the supposed holotype of Chelodina oblonga was in fact part of a type series and molecular work showed it was in fact from Perth. This led to a more detailed examination of its history and the determination that it was indeed the southwestern snake-necked turtle. Thus, the correct name scientific names are Chelodina oblonga for the southwestern snake-necked turtle and Chelodina rugosa for the northern snake-necked turtle.

Synonymy
Synonymy of Chelodina oblonga, and redescriptions of the type specimens, per Shea, Thomson and Georges (2020):
Chelodina oblonga Gray, 1841: 446 (misidentified type sensu Thomson 2000)
Chelodina (Macrochelodina) oblonga — Shea, Thomson & Georges, 2020 
Chelodina colliei Gray, 1856: 200
Chelodina colliei — Thomson, 2006
Macrodiremys oblonga — McCord & Joseph-Ouni, 2007
Chelodina (Macrodiremys) colliei — Georges & Thomson, 2010
Chelodina (Macrodiremys) colliei — TTWG, 2014
Chelodina colliei — Kehlmaier et al., 2019:6
Chelodina (Macrochelodina) oblonga — Shea et al., 2020

References

Reptiles of Western Australia
Macrochelodina
Reptiles described in 1856
Taxa named by John Edward Gray
Taxonomy articles created by Polbot
Turtles of Australia
Endemic fauna of Southwest Australia